Leptospermum fastigiatum is a shrub that is endemic to the south-west of Australia. It has narrow egg-shaped leaves with the narrower end towards the base and a small point on the tip, white flowers arranged singly or in pairs on short side shoots and small fruit that fall off when mature.

Description
There are a few broad, reddish brown bracts at the base of the flower bud that usually fall off as the flower opens.

Taxonomy and naming
Leptospermum fastigiatum was first formally described in 1920 by the botanist Spencer Moore in the Journal of the Linnean Society, Botany. The specific epithet (fastigiatum) is a Latin word meaning "fastigiate", (erect and parallel).

Distribution and habitat
This tea-tree is found on sand plains and among rocky outcrops in the Wheatbelt and Goldfields-Esperance regions of Western Australia extending into the Great Victoria Desert in western South Australia, growing in sandy soils.

Uses
This plant contains essential oils, including 82.8% α-pinene.

References

fastigiatum
Flora of Western Australia
Flora of South Australia
Plants described in 1920